The Belmont Prize is a music award named after the place of destiny in Shakespeare's The Merchant of Venice. The Munich-based Forberg Schneider Foundation, founded in 1997, promotes outstanding achievements in the field of contemporary music. The biennially-awarded prize is endowed with €20,000 and is one of Europe’s highest endowed awards for artistic creation.

Recipients
 1999 Jörg Widmann
 2001 Florent Boffard
 2004 Carolin Widmann
 2005 Quatuor Ébène
 2007 Bruno Mantovani
 2009 
 2012 Alex Ross
 2013 Sabrina Hölzer
 2015 Milica Djordjevic
 2018 Eamonn Quinn
 2020 Florian Weber
 2022 Sarah Aristidou

References

External links
  

German music awards
Awards established in 1997
1997 establishments in Germany